Guilty Party is an American dark comedy streaming television series adapted from a screenplay by Rebecca Addelman and directed by Trent O'Donnell. The main role in the series was played by Kate Beckinsale, Geoff Stults, Jules Latimer, Tiya Sircar, Alanna Ubach, Laurie Davidson and Andre Hyland. The series premiered on October 14, 2021 on Paramount+.

In January 2023, the series was removed from Paramount+.

Premise
A journalist Beth Burgess (Kate Beckinsale) with a tarnished reputation focuses on a story about a woman who denies murdering her husband.

Cast
 Kate Beckinsale as Beth Burgess
 Geoff Stults as Marco Strzalkowski
 Jules Latimer as Toni
 Tiya Sircar as Fiona
 Alanna Ubach as Tessa Flores
 Laurie Davidson as George
 Andre Hyland as Wyatt

Episodes

Production
It was announced in March 2020 that Isla Fisher was cast to star in the series, which was greenlit by CBS All Access. However by December, Fisher would exit the series due to concerns regarding the COVID-19 pandemic, with Kate Beckinsale cast to replace her. In March 2021, Geoff Stults, Jules Latimer, Tiya Sircar, Alanna Ubach, Laurie Davidson and Andre Hyland were added to the cast.

Filming in the series had begun by March 2021 in Calgary.

The series premiered October 14, 2021.

Reception

The review aggregator website Rotten Tomatoes reported a 40% approval rating with an average rating of 5.50/10, based on 10 critic reviews.

References

External links

2020s American black comedy television series
2021 American television series debuts
2021 American television series endings
English-language television shows
Paramount+ original programming
Television series by Funny or Die
Television series by CBS Studios
Television shows filmed in Calgary